Marco Tasca, O.F.M. Conv. is an Italian prelate of the Catholic Church, a member of the Order of Friars Minor Conventual who served as the 119th Minister General of the Order from 2007 to 2019. He was appointed as the Archbishop of Genoa on 8 May 2020.

Early life
Marco Tasca was born on 9 June 1957 in Sant’Angelo di Piove in the province of Padua, Italy, to Antonio and Santa Tasca. He entered the Order at Camposampiero on 29 September 1968 and attended lower primary school and the Seraphic Seminary of Pedavena in the province of Belluno and then the Lyceum-Minor Seminary in Brescia.

He made his novitiate at the Basilica of St. Anthony (1976-1977) and professed his first vows on 17 September 1977. He then studied theology at the Sant'Antonio Dottore Theological Institute, earning his bachelor's degree in 1982. On 28 November 1981 he professed his solemn vows. In 1982, he lived at the Seraphicum in Rome while attending courses toward a licentiate at the Salesian Pontifical University.

Priest
He was ordained to the priesthood on 19 March 1983 in his home town by Bishop Filippo Franceschi, Bishop of Padua. In 1986 he completed his licentiate in psychology at the Salesian University, and two years later a licentiate in pastoral theology at the same university. He returned to Padua and was rector of the Minor Seminary in Brescia from 1988 to 1994 and rector of the Post-Novitiate in Padua from 1994 to 2001.

He was Professor of Psychology and Catechetics at the “Sant’Antonio Dottore” Theological Institute. At the Provincial Chapter of 2001 he was elected Custos Capitularis and Guardian of Camposampiero at Padua. He held those posts until he was elected Minister Provincial in 2005. He is vice-president of the Major Superiors' Conference of Italy and President of the Franciscan Movement of the North-East.

On 26 May 2007, at the Sacred Convent in Assisi, the Ordinary General Chapter elected him to a six-year term as Minister General, the 119th successor to St. Francis. He was reelected to a second term in January 2013. He ended his service as Minister General on 17 May 2019.

He was elected on three occasions as one of ten members of the Union of Superiors General to participate in a Synod of Bishops, at the 2012 Synod on the New Evangelization, at the 2015 Synod on the Family, and at the 2018 Synod on Youth. In 2018 he supported the idea of allowing women superiors to participate as well.

Archbishop 
On 8 May 2020, Pope Francis appointed him to succeed Cardinal Angelo Bagnasco as Archbishop of Genova. He received his episcopal consecration on 11 July by Cardinal Angelo Bagnasco and simultaneously took formal canonical possession of the archdiocese.

References

1957 births
Living people
Salesian Pontifical University alumni
Roman Catholic archbishops of Genoa
Conventual Friars Minor
21st-century Italian Roman Catholic archbishops
Ministers General of the Order of Friars Minor Conventual
Conventual Franciscan bishops
People from the Province of Padua